Zungeru Hydroelectric Power Station is a  hydroelectric power plant under construction in Niger State, Nigeria. When completed, as expected, it will be the second-largest hydroelectric power station in the country, behind the  Kainji Hydroelectric Power Station.

Location
The power station is located across the Kaduna River, near the town of Zungeru, in Niger State, in northwestern Nigeria.

The geographical coordinates of Zungeru Hydroelectric Power Station are: 09°54'18.0"N, 06°17'32.0"E (Latitude:9.905000; Longitude:6.292222). This power station is located between Shiroro Hydroelectric Power Station (upstream) and Jebba Hydroelectric Power Station (downstream).

Overview
Zungeru HPP is a large energy infrastructure project and at 700 megawatts capacity, is Nigeria's second-largest hydroelectricity power station, behind the Kainji Hydroelectric Power Plant, which has capacity of 760 megawatts. 

This will create a reservoir capable of storing "10.4 billion m3 of water".

The energy generated will be evacuated via two high voltage lines: (a) a 135kV line to Kainji Dam and (b) a double circuit 330kV line to connect to the line between Shiroro and Jebba dams. The power will subsequently be integrated into the Nigerian electricity grid.

Construction
The project cost has been reported as 1.3 billion US dollars. Of that, 25 percent is sourced from the Federal Government of Nigeria, and 75 percent is a loan from the Chinese government, through the Exim Bank of China. Construction started in 2013, with an initial completion date of 2018.

The engineering, procurement, and construction contract was awarded to a Chinese consortium comprising China National Electric Engineering Company (CNEEC) and Sinohydro. A new completion date has been reported to be December 2021.

In January 2022, Afrik21.africa reported that Zungeru HPP would be commissioned in phases during 2022. It is expected that the first turbine, with generation capacity of 175 megawatts would come online during the first quarter of the year. The next turbine, with equal capacity, would then follow the first, after approximately ninety days, and so on, until all four turbines are installed for maximum generation capacity of 700 MW. The power station would add 2,640 GWh to the Nigerian grid, annually. This is equal to approximately 10 percent of installed national generation capacity, as of January 2022.

Youth protest 
Over 1,000 youth led by Bello Sheriff, protested by holding a demonstration on the Kontagora–Minna Road, over the deplorable state of the roads in the area. The protesters held banners and posters, including those that read: "We are suffering because of bad roads" and "Power state without power". The protesters insisted that their demands must be met.

Displaced settlers 
When Senator David Umaru visited the IDP camp in Zungeru, he sympathized over the victims for the delay in payment. The senator said 2 billion naira was given by Nigerian Federal Government to Niger State Government for the resettlement of affected people in the community.

The Nigerian vice president Yemi Osinbajo, on a visit to the Hydroelectric station promised the 500 displaced settlers that are settled in a new location in New Gungu Wushishi with an immediate effect of the payment.

Developments
In early November 2022, the Federal Government of Nigeria advertised the first stage of the two-phased process of selecting the concessionaire who will operate, manage and maintain the power station for the first 30 years of its commercial life. The first phase is intended to prequalify applicants, while the second stage would evaluate the short-listed firms based on their detailed bids. Consortia were also invited to apply. At that time, the power station was about 96 percent complete, with commercial commissioning planned in the first quarter of 2023.

References

External links
 Advisory services sought for concession of Zungeru hydropower plant As of 25 March 2021.

Energy infrastructure in Nigeria
Hydroelectric power stations in Nigeria
Dams in Nigeria
Niger State
Crossings by river
Niger River